Kids Only is an Australian children's television show which screened on the Nine Network from 1986 to 1988 hosted by Glenn Ridge, who went on to host Sale of the Century.

See also
 List of Australian television series
 Wombat

References

External links

Australian children's television series
Australian television shows featuring puppetry
Nine Network original programming
1986 Australian television series debuts
1988 Australian television series endings